Tharus Son of Attila, also known as Colossus and the Huns, is a 1962 Italian  peplum film co-written and directed  by Roberto Bianchi Montero and starring Jerome Courtland in the title role.

Plot

Cast    
 Jerome Courtland as Tharus
 Lisa Gastoni as Princess Gamal
 Mimmo Palmara as Gudrum
 Rik Van Nutter as Oto
 Livio Lorenzon as King Hatum
 Giuseppe Addobbati as Kimg Bolem

References

External links

    
Peplum films 
1960s adventure films   
Films directed by Roberto Bianchi Montero
Films set in the 5th century
Films with screenplays by Roberto Bianchi Montero
Sword and sandal films
1960s Italian-language films
1960s Italian films